The 2005 UEFA Futsal Championship was the fifth official edition of the UEFA-governed European Championship for national futsal teams. It was held in Ostrava, Czech Republic, between 14 February and 20 February 2005. Spain, the reigning FIFA World Champion, defeated Russia in the final, winning their third (with 1996 and 2001) UEFA Championship. The third place match was a repeat of the 2003 final, with Italy again defeating Ukraine, this time 3–1. Fernando Grana's opener in the third place match helped him finish as top scorer in the tournament with six goals.

Venues
The tournament played the majority of the matches in the 10,000 seat ČEZ Aréna in the city of Ostrava. The other arena used on the last day of group matches was the Sareza.

Referees
 Anton Averianov (Russia)
 Silvo Borosak (Slovenia)
 Massimo Cumbo (Italy)
 Antonio Jose Fernandes Cardoso (Portugal)
 Jyrki Filppu (Finland)
 Pedro Ángel Galán Nieto (Spain)
 Christian Hauben (Belgium)
 Zbigniew Kosmala (Poland)
 Radek Lobo (Czech Republic)
 Ivan Novak (Croatia)
 Károly Török (Hungaria)
 Antonius van Eekelen (Netherlands)

Qualification
Twenty-eight nations took part in the qualifying round, with hosts Czech Republic automatically qualified.

Qualifying was played in two stages, with 8 sides competing in the preliminary round between 6–11 January 2004. The winners of the two groups progressed to join the other 26 entrants in the next phase. In the main qualifying round, which took place between 27 January-1 February, there was seven groups of four with the first-placed teams advancing to the final tournament.

Qualified teams

1 Bold indicates champion for that year

Final tournament

Group stage

Group A

Group B

Knockout stage

Semi-finals

Third place

Final

Champions

Final ranking

Top goalscorers

References

External links
 , RSSSF Archive
 Official UEFA website

 
2005
2005
UEFA
2004–05 in Czech football
Sport in Ostrava
UEFA Futsal Championship